Braywick is a linear suburb in the southern portion of the unparished area of Maidenhead and formerly in the civil parish of Bray in the English county of Berkshire. It is incorrectly called Bray Wick on Ordnance Survey maps.

Geography

Natural conservation areas
Braywick Park is a park and local nature reserve on the west side of the York Stream. Adjoining this, on the east side of York Stream, is a site of Special Scientific Interest (SSSI) called Bray Meadows.

Notable people
Arthur Dillon (1750–1794) was an Irish Catholic aristocrat born in England who inherited the ownership of a regiment that served France under the Ancien Régime during the American Revolutionary War and then the French First Republic during the War of the First Coalition.

References

External links

Villages in Berkshire
Maidenhead
Bray, Berkshire